Mikko Tapio Kyyrö (born 12 July 1980 in Kerava) is a male discus thrower from Finland. His personal best throw is 64.14 metres, achieved on 29 June 2007 in Jalasjärvi.

In 2007 Kyyrö was found guilty of methylprednisolone doping. The sample was delivered on 5 August 2007 in an in-competition test at the national athletics championships. He only received a public warning.

Achievements

See also
List of sportspeople sanctioned for doping offences

References

1980 births
Living people
People from Kerava
Finnish male discus throwers
Doping cases in athletics
Finnish sportspeople in doping cases
World Athletics Championships athletes for Finland
Sportspeople from Uusimaa